Gian Michele Graf (born 14 July 1962) is a Swiss mathematical physicist.

Graf studied physics and mathematics at ETH Zurich, where he graduated in 1986 with Diplom thesis supervised by Jürg Fröhlich and received his doctorate in 1990 with thesis supervised by Walter Hunziker (1935–2012) . From 1990 to 1992 Graf was an assistant professor of mathematics at Caltech. At ETH Zurich he was from 1992 to 1998 an assistant professor and from 1998 to 2001 an associate professor and is since 2001 a full professor.

He was at the Institute for Advanced Study in 1996 and in 2002. He has been a visiting researcher in six different countries.

Graf's research deals with fundamental thermodynamic properties of matter (especially questions related to the problem of the "stability of matter" mathematically investigated by Elliott Lieb and others), many-body scattering processes in quantum mechanics, quantum pumps and various problems of solid-state physics such as the quantum Hall effect and topological insulators. 

He was a plenary speaker at the 10th International Congress on Mathematical Physics (ICMP) in Leipzig in 1991 and an invited speaker at the 14th ICMP in Lisbon in 2003. In 1992 he was a Sloan Fellow. He was an invited speaker of the International Congress of Mathematicians (ICM) in 1998 in Berlin and of the ICM in 2006 in Madrid.

Graf is a Swiss Bürger of Lugano and Rebstein.

Selected publications

References

1962 births
Living people
Swiss physicists
Sloan Research Fellows
Theoretical physicists
ETH Zurich alumni
Academic staff of ETH Zurich